Sergei Ovchinnikov  may refer to:
 Sergei Ovchinnikov (volleyball) (1969–2012), Russian volleyball coach
 Sergei Ovchinnikov (footballer, born 1970), manager and former association football goalkeeper who played for the Russian national team
 Sergei Ovchinnikov (footballer, born 1984), Russian footballer